Gerres cinereus, also known by its common name yellowfin mojarra is a species from the genus Gerres. The species was originally described by Johann Julius Walbaum in 1792.

References

Taxa named by Johann Julius Walbaum
cinereus